David C. Shapiro (February 16, 1925 – August 1, 1981) was an American dentist and politician.

Born in Mendota, Illinois, Shapiro served in the United States Army during World War II. He went to Stanford University. Shapiro then received his bachelor's and dentist degrees from University of Illinois. He was a dentist in Amboy, Illinois. Shapiro served on the Amboy City Council and on the Amboy Unit School Board. Shapiro also president of the Lee County Board of Health. In 1969, Shapiro served in the Illinois House of Representatives and was a Republican. He then served in the Illinois State Senate until his death. Shapiro died at his summer home in Livingston, Montana. He had been ill with cancer and diabetes.

Notes

1925 births
1981 deaths
People from Amboy, Illinois
People from Mendota, Illinois
Military personnel from Illinois
Stanford University alumni
University of Illinois alumni
American dentists
School board members in Illinois
Illinois city council members
Republican Party members of the Illinois House of Representatives
Republican Party Illinois state senators
20th-century American politicians
20th-century dentists